Kemal Kayacan (1915, Sinop, Kastamonu Vilayet - 29 July 1992, Kadıköy) was a Turkish admiral. He was Commander of the Turkish Naval Forces from 1972 to 1974. He was elected to the Grand National Assembly of Turkey at the 1977 Turkish general election, serving until 1980.

He was assassinated at his home in 1992.

He was a graduate of the Turkish Naval High School.

References 

1915 births
1992 deaths
People from Sinop, Turkey
People from Kastamonu vilayet
Republican People's Party (Turkey) politicians
Deputies of Ankara
Commanders of the Turkish Naval Forces
Assassinated Turkish people